Willard Richardson Espy (December 11, 1910February 20, 1999) was an American editor, philologist, writer, poet, and local historian. Raised in the seaside village of Oysterville, Washington, Espy later studied at the University of Redlands in California before becoming an editor in New York City, as well as a contributor to Reader's Digest, The New Yorker, Punch, and other publications.

In the 1960s, he began publishing books on philology as well collections of poetry collections, and became the best-known collector of and commentator on word play of his time. In 1977, he published the national bestseller Oysterville: Roads to Grandpa's Village, a semi-autobiographical novel about his familial heritage in the Oysterville community. Espy died at New York Hospital in Manhattan in 1999, and was interred at Oysterville Cemetery.

Early life 
Espy was born in Olympia, Washington in 1910, the sixth of seven children, to Harry Albert Espy (1876–1959) and Helen Medora Espy ( Richardson; 1878–1954). His father, a one-time Washington state senator, was of Scots-Irish descent. His mother was from San Francisco, the daughter of a local preacher.

He and his siblings were raised in the coastal village of Oysterville, Washington, which had been founded in 1854 by his grandfather, R. H. Espy, a settler who arrived in Oregon Territory via The Oregon Trail. Espy graduated from the University of Redlands in 1930 with a B.A. after which he spent a year abroad, enrolling at the Sorbonne in Paris, planning to study philosophy. He returned to the United States in 1932, working as a newspaper editor in California, later moving to New York City where he was eventually hired by Reader's Digest in 1941. Espy spent next sixteen years working for Reader's Digest in various positions, including as promotion director.

Career
Espy's writing career took off in the late 1960s; he eventually authored fifteen books on language, and his poetry and articles regularly appeared in Punch, Reader's Digest, The Atlantic Monthly, The Nation, and Word Ways: The Journal of Recreational Linguistics. Espy earned praise from contemporary critics such as Louis Untermeyer and John Chancellor. Summarizing Espy's writing, critic Alistair Cooke wrote:

Later in life, Espy divided his time between Manhattan and his home in Oysterville, and wrote nationally bestselling books on local history, including Oysterville: Roads to Grandpa's Village (1977) and Skulduggery on Shoalwater Bay (1998). Two of his books on wordplay, The Game of Words and An Almanac of Words at Play, were honored at the Governor's Writers Day Awards (now the Washington State Book Awards),
 and the latter was a national bestseller. He was also a contributing writer for The New Yorker and other publications.

Death

Espy died aged 88 at New York Hospital in Manhattan on February 20, 1999. He is interred in a family plot in Oysterville Cemetery. His second wife Louise, a native of New York, died in November 2011, and was interred beside him.

Legacy
The Espy Foundation was established in 1998; the non-profit foundation, based out of Espy's home in Oysterville, Washington, served as a retreat space for artists and writers in the Pacific Northwest. In December 2010, the foundation officially closed.

Espy's light verse has been compared to that of Lewis Carroll, W. S. Gilbert, Ogden Nash and Cole Porter.

Bibliography
 The Game of Words (1971) 
 Oysterville: Roads to Grandpa's Village (1976) 
 The Game of Words (1972) 
 Omak Me Yours Tonight, or, Ilwaco million miles for one of your smiles: A Ballard of Washington State (1973) 
 An Almanac of Words at Play (1975) 
 The Life and Works of Mr. Anonymous (1977) 
 O Thou Improper, Thou Uncommon Noun (1978) 
 Say it My Way: How to avoid certain pitfalls of spoken English together with a decidedly informal history of how our language rose (or fell) (1980) 
 Another Almanac of Words at Play (1981) 
 The Wars of the Words (1980)
 A Children's Almanac of Words at Play (1982) 
 Have A Word on Me: A Celebration of Language (1984) 
 Espygrams: Anagram Verse (1982) 
 Word Puzzles: Anagrams from America's Favorite Logophile (1983) 
 The Garden of Eloquence: A Rhetorical Bestiary (1983) 
 Espygrams II: 80 New Anagram Verses (1984) 
 Words to Rhyme With (1986) 
 The Word's Gotten Out (1989) 
 Skullduggery on Shoalwater Bay (1998)
 The Best of An Almanac of Words at Play (1999)

References

Works cited

External links

 Willard Richardson Espy at WorldCat

American book editors
American humorists
American male novelists
American people of Scotch-Irish descent
American philologists
American male poets
1910 births
1999 deaths
Reader's Digest
The Atlantic (magazine) people
Punch (magazine) people
The Nation (U.S. magazine) people
Writers from Olympia, Washington
University of Redlands alumni
20th-century American poets
People from Pacific County, Washington
20th-century American novelists
20th-century American male writers
20th-century philologists